Arthur Somers-Cocks (19 May 1870 – 9 February 1923) was an English-born West Indian cricketer: a right-handed batsman and right arm fast bowler who played ten first-class games for Barbados around the turn of the twentieth century. Nine of these matches came between the 1894-95 and 1896-97 seasons, with a final appearance in 1901-02.

Playing against R. S. Lucas' XI at Bridgetown in February 1895, Somers-Cocks achieved a career-best innings return of 8-99.In 1896/97 he took a hat-trick against A Priestley's XI at the same ground.

He was born in Bredbury, Stockport, Cheshire; he died aged 52 at Harrison College, Bridgetown.

Notes

References

English cricketers
Barbados cricketers
1870 births
1923 deaths
People from Bredbury